My Chinese Coach is a video game for the Nintendo DS and iOS developed by Sensory Sweep Studios and published by Ubisoft. As an installment of the My Coach series, the game teaches Mandarin Chinese through a series of lessons and games. It was released August 26, 2008.

Gameplay
According to Ubisoft, My Chinese Coach will develop a player's Chinese knowledge by lessons which teach the player the correct ways to pronounce words in Mandarin Chinese by comparing themselves to native speakers using the Nintendo DS's, iPhone's, or iPod Touch's microphone, as well as using the touch screen or stylus to allow players to trace and correctly write simplified Chinese characters.

References

2008 video games
Language learning video games
IOS games
Nintendo DS games
Puzzle video games
Ubisoft games
Video games developed in the United States
Sensory Sweep Studios games